Hwang Dae-heon (born 5 July 1999) is a South Korean short track speed skater. He also currently holds the world record in men's 1000 metres short track speed skating.

He represented South Korea in the 2018 Pyeongchang Winter Olympics and won the silver medal in the men's 500 metres short track speed skating. 
 
In the 2022 Beijing Winter Olympics, he won the gold medal in the 1500 metres event and the silver medal in the 5000 metres relay event of men's short track speed skating while on the South Korean team. During the games he also set the Olympic record for the men's 1000 metres event.

Hwang withdrew from the 2021-22 season world championships after getting infected with COVID-19 in March. While he also failed to win any of the qualification events for the 2022-23 season national team due to long covid syndromes .

Results

Olympic Games 

 Only top 5 finishes are shown

World Cup 

 Only top 5 finishes are shown

World Championship 

 Only top 5 finishes are shown

Four Continents Championship 

 Only top 5 finishes are shown

Filmography

Television show

Awards and nominations

See also
 List of Youth Olympic Games gold medalists who won Olympic gold medals
 List of 2018 Winter Olympics medal winners
 List of 2022 Winter Olympics medal winners

References

External links

International Skating Union Profile

 

1999 births
Living people
Four Continents Short Track Speed Skating Championships medalists
South Korean male short track speed skaters
Olympic short track speed skaters of South Korea
Olympic gold medalists for South Korea
Olympic silver medalists for South Korea
Olympic medalists in short track speed skating
Short track speed skaters at the 2018 Winter Olympics
Short track speed skaters at the 2022 Winter Olympics
Medalists at the 2018 Winter Olympics
Medalists at the 2022 Winter Olympics
World Short Track Speed Skating Championships medalists
People from Anyang, Gyeonggi
Short track speed skaters at the 2016 Winter Youth Olympics
Youth Olympic gold medalists for South Korea
Sportspeople from Gyeonggi Province
21st-century South Korean people